Indian hedgehog homolog (Drosophila), also known as IHH, is a protein which in humans is encoded by the IHH gene. This cell signaling protein is in the hedgehog signaling pathway. The several mammalian variants of the Drosophila hedgehog gene (which was the first named) have been named after the various species of hedgehog; the Indian hedgehog is honored by this one. The gene is not specific to Indian hedgehogs.

Function

The Indian hedgehog protein is one of three proteins in the mammalian hedgehog family, the others being desert hedgehog (DHH) and sonic hedgehog (SHH). It is involved in chondrocyte differentiation, proliferation and maturation especially during endochondral ossification. It regulates its effects by feedback control of parathyroid hormone-related peptide (PTHrP).

Indian Hedge Hog, (Ihh) is one of three signaling molecules from the Hedgehog (Hh) gene family. Genes of the Hh family, Sonic Hedgehog (Shh), Desert Hedgehog (Dhh) and Ihh regulate several fetal developmental processes. The Ihh homolog is involved in the formation of chondrocytes during the development of limbs. The protein is released by small, non-proliferating, mature chondrocytes during endochondral ossification. Recently, Ihh mutations are shown to cause brachydactyly type A1 (BDA1), the first Mendelian autosomal dominant disorder in humans to be recorded. There are seven known mutations to Ihh that cause BDA1. Of particular interest, are mutations involving the E95 residue, which is thought to be involved with proper signaling mechanisms between Ihh and its receptors. In a mouse model, mice with mutations to the E95 residue were found to have abnormalities to their digits.

Ihh may also be involved in endometrial cell differentiation and implantation. Studies have shown progesterone to upregulate Ihh expression in the murine endometrium, suggesting a role in implantation. Ihh is suspected to be involved in the downstream regulation of other signaling molecules that are known to play a role in murine implantation. Mouse models involving Ihh null mice demonstrated failure of attachment and decidualization.

References

Further reading

 
 
 
 
 
 

Proteins
Morphogens